"Teri Meri" is an Indian Hindi-language song from the (2011) Bollywood film Bodyguard directed by Siddique, starring Salman Khan and Kareena Kapoor. The song was sung by Rahat Fateh Ali Khan and Shreya Ghoshal. The song was composed by Himesh Reshammiya, while its lyrics were penned by Shabbir Ahmed. The song along with the other tracks was released on 27 July 2011.

Composition and picturization 
"Teri Meri" is a sad romantic song sung by Rahat Fateh Ali Khan and Shreya Ghoshal. The song is high on Sufi touch, while it scores on vocals. The song is also available in remix and reprise version. The tune of the song has been Cleopatra Stratan's song La Betlem Colo n jons. Cleopatra Stratan is a Moldova baby singer who started her career at the age of 3. 

The song is a romantic number from the film Bodyguard. "Teri Meri" was picturised on Salman Khan and Kareena Kapoor. It was choreographed by Vaibhavi Merchant.
An important part of this song is not original. The original song it is a Christmas carol composed by Nicolae Lungu from Romania and it is called "To Bethleem down the street".

Reception 
Ruchika Kher of the Indo-Asian News Service reviewed the song as moderately paced and a quite average song.

The Times of India placed Teri Meri among the top 10 songs of 2011. The song was non-mover for 19 weeks at No. 1 on The Official Asian Download Chart show on BBC Asian Network, hosted by Bobby Friction. It went on to being one of the few songs to have been in the chart for over an astonishing 30 weeks. The song had also won awards for Shreya Ghoshal at the 13th IIFA Awards, BIG Star Entertainment Awards 2011 and the 2012 Apsara Awards for Best Female Playback Singer.

Plagiarism

The melody of the song Teri Meri is a direct copy of the traditional Christian Romanian carol, singing about Jesus` Birth "La Vifleem Colo-n Jos".

Accolades

References

External links

2011 songs
Hindi film songs
Indian songs
Shreya Ghoshal songs
Rahat Fateh Ali Khan songs